State Route 179 (SR 179) is a 43.4 mile long east-west state highway in West Tennessee, connecting Covington with Whiteville via Stanton and Dancyville.

Route description

SR 179 begins in Tipton County just east of Covington at an intersection with SR 54. It heads southeast through rural areas, where it has an intersection with SR 14, before crossing into Haywood County. The highway then passes through Stanton, where it has an intersection with US 70/US 79/SR 1, as it runs along Covington Street, W Main Street, and S Main Street. SR 179 leaves Stanton and continues east along Stanton Koko Road through rural areas before turning south along Dancyville Road to have an interchange with I-40 (Exit 47). It then enters Dancyville, where it comes to an intersection and becomes concurrent with SR 76. They go north to pass through rural areas to come to the community of Ko Ko, where SR 179 splits off and goes east southeast to cross into Hardeman County. SR 179 then turns south and enters Whiteville along Oak Street. It then has a short concurrency with US 64 Business (W Main Street) in downtown before turning south along S Cross Avenue to come to an end at an intersection with US 64/SR 15. The entire route of SR 179 is a two-lane highway.

Major intersections

References

179
Transportation in Tipton County, Tennessee
Transportation in Haywood County, Tennessee
Transportation in Hardeman County, Tennessee